Jean-Pierre Schmitz (Jempy Schmitz) (15 February 1932 – 14 November 2017) was a Luxembourgish professional road bicycle racer. Schmitz won the Midi Libre in 1957, the Tour de Luxembourg in 1954 and 1958, and one stage in the 1956 Tour de France. In 1955, Schmitz was second in the World Road race championship after Stan Ockers.

Schmitz died on 14 November 2017 at the age of 85.

Major results
1952  national amateur road race championship
1954 Tour de Luxembourg
1955 Chalon-sur-Saône
1956 Tour de France, Winner stage 12
1957 Grand Prix du Midi Libre
1958  national road race championship and Tour de Luxembourg

References

External links 

Official Tour de France results for Jean-Pierre Schmitz

1932 births
2017 deaths
People from Troisvierges
Luxembourgian male cyclists
Luxembourgian Tour de France stage winners